

Results
Bournemouth's score comes first

Legend

Football League Two

FA Cup

Football League Cup

Football League Trophy

Squad
Squad at end of season

Left club during season

References 

AFC Bournemouth seasons
A.F.C. Bournemouth